Eric Bauza (born December 7, 1979) is a Canadian-American voice actor and comedian. His most-known roles include Stimpy on Ren and Stimpy "Adult Party Cartoon", Foop on The Fairly OddParents, Thunderbolt Ross on Iron Man: Armored Adventures, and Fozzie Bear on Muppet Babies. He is the current voice of many characters, including Bugs Bunny, Daffy Duck, Porky Pig, Marvin the Martian, Pepé Le Pew, Tweety, Speedy Gonzales, Henery Hawk, Barnyard Dawg, Woody Woodpecker, Boo-Boo Bear, Atom Ant, Luke Skywalker, and Dino.

For his role in Looney Tunes Cartoons, Bauza won the first ever Children's and Family Emmy Award for Outstanding Voice Performance in an Animated Program.

Early life
Bauza is of Filipino descent. He stated that watching Mr. Dressup while growing up inspired his creative side; Bauza would draw with the host of the show while he was watching it.

Bauza was born and raised in the Toronto suburb of Scarborough. He attended Cardinal Newman Catholic High School (now St. John Henry Newman) in Scarborough, from 1993 to 1996. He graduated from Centennial College in 2000.

Career
Bauza started his career in animation as a character designer in Hollywood.

Bauza has appeared in El Tigre: The Adventures of Manny Rivera, The Fairly OddParents, Ren & Stimpy "Adult Party Cartoon", Coconut Fred's Fruit Salad Island, G.I. Joe: Resolute and Hero: 108. He has also played multiple roles on "The King and Us", a web-series sponsored by Burger King, and was seen on the NFL during Fox's pre-game show.

Bauza is the voice of Lord Stingray on the Adult Swim series Superjail!, Marvin the Martian on The Looney Tunes Show and Dr. Psychobos on Ben 10: Omniverse. He also appeared in episodes of the animated web series Dick Figures, where he voiced the Genie of the Teapot, the Vulgar Mall Santa, and the Ninjas. He has also been the voice of Lord Takagami, the main antagonist of Dick Figures: The Movie. He played Buhdeuce in Breadwinners and the title character in Netflix's The Adventures of Puss in Boots.

Bauza has performed stand-up comedy at the Laugh Factory in Los Angeles.

Bauza has voiced characters including Bugs Bunny, Daffy Duck, Tweety, Marvin the Martian, and Woody Woodpecker. He also voiced Rash in the 2020 version of Battletoads. Bauza was briefly a late night talk show host on The Late Night Show Tonight.

On March 23, 2021, Bauza appeared on the ABC game show To Tell The Truth and performed in his Looney Tunes voices.

In 2022, he hosted Stay Tooned, a six-part documentary series on the cultural impact of cartoons, for CBC Gem.

Filmography

Film

Television

Video games

Other

References

External links

 Eric's Blog
 

1979 births
Living people
20th-century Canadian comedians
20th-century Canadian male actors
21st-century Canadian comedians
21st-century Canadian male actors
Canadian animators
Canadian expatriate male actors in the United States
Canadian impressionists (entertainers)
Canadian male comedians
Canadian male video game actors
Canadian male voice actors
Canadian male actors of Filipino descent
Comedians from Toronto
Emmy Award winners
Male actors from Toronto